is a 2014 Japanese-Canadian coproduced baseball drama film directed by Yuya Ishii, based on the true story of a Vancouver-based baseball team called the Vancouver Asahi which existed before the Second World War. It was released to Japanese theaters on December 20.

Plot
The film is set in Canada during the 1930s.

Cast
Satoshi Tsumabuki as Reggie Kasahara
Kazuya Kamenashi as Roy Naganishi
Ryō Katsuji as Kei Kitamoto
Yusuke Kamiji as Tom Miyake
Sosuke Ikematsu as Frank Nojima
Kōichi Satō as Seiji Kasahara

Reception
The film has grossed ¥882 million at the Japanese box office.

The film was screened at the 2014 Vancouver International Film Festival, where it won the People's Choice Award as the most popular film at the festival.

See also
Asahi (baseball team)
Japanese Canadians

References

External links
 

2014 films
2014 drama films
2010s sports drama films
Canadian baseball films
Canadian sports drama films
Japanese baseball films
Japanese sports drama films
Films about Japanese Canadians
Films directed by Yuya Ishii
Films set in Vancouver
Films set in the 1930s
Films with screenplays by Satoko Okudera
Films shot in Vancouver
2010s Canadian films
2010s Japanese films